RJS may refer to:

Raymond James Stadium, a football stadium in Tampa, Florida
Rachel Joy Scott (1981–1999), American high school student
Robert James Speers